Michael Klar (* 1943 in Berlin) is a German graphic artist, designer and professor for Visual Communication.

Life and Work 
Michael Klar qualified as a photographer at the Lette-Verein in Berlin. From 1963 to 1966 he studied at the Visual Communication Department of the renowned "Hochschule für Gestaltung Ulm", Germany. Among his tutors were Otl Aicher, Herbert W. Kapitzki and Tomás Maldonado.

Between 1966 and 1967 he worked as assistant in the Kapitzki/Ohl project group for the pavilion of the Federal Republic of Germany at the world exhibition EXPO 67 Montreal, Canada. He graduated in 1968 obtaining his diploma from the HfG (Hochschule für Gestaltung) Ulm. He acted as student spokesman during the year in which the school was forced to close.

From 1968 to 1970 he was involved in the development of a design lab, the "Holzäpfel Projekt Institut". In 1970 together with architect Bernd Meurer he initiated the "Project Co'", a design studio in Ulm.

In 1972 Klar was called as professor for Visual Communication to the "Hochschule für Gestaltung Schwäbisch Gmünd" where he was to influence the concepts and programme of the college. Furthermore, during the same period, he held several guest professorships in various design schools, among which the Ohio State University, USA, the Emily Carr University of Art and Design Vancouver, Canada and the Università Iuav di Venezia, Italy.

Between 1992 and 1994 Klar also served as founding dean of the "Faculty of Gestaltung" at the Hochschule für Technik und Wirtschaft in Dresden, Germany.

From 1992 till 2008 Klar taught at the "Hochschule der Künste Berlin", which was later named "Universität der Künste" and held the position of Professor for Visual Communication at the "Institut für Transmediale Gestaltung".

Michael Klar lives in Berlin where he works as a designer.

Publications 
 Ulmer Statistik, Ulm 14/15/16 1965 
 Zeichensysteme, Dynamische Fernsehanzeige, Ulm 17/18 1966
 aus der hfg: ein Beitrag zur Expo ‘67 in Montreal, Ulmer Forum Heft 2/1967
 Kritik an der Rolle des Design in der Verschwendungsgesellschaft, Format 20, Nr. 2/1969
 Studieneinführung Design, Aspekte, Nr. 3/1973
 Kommunikation und Praxis, Kritik der Alltagskultur, Ästhetik + Kommunikation 1979
 Ausbildung ist Praxis, Format 80, Nr. 4/1979
 HfG Synopse, Hrsg. N. H. Roericht, Ulm 1982
 Geschichte der Produktivkräfte, Michael Klar u. a. VSA Verlag 1982
 Erscheinungsbild für einen Büromöbelhersteller, Novum, Nr. 5/1984
 Michael Klar, Rasegna, Anno VI, 19/3 Settembre 1984
 Michael Klar, The European Iceberg, Creativity in Germany and Italy Today, Art Gallery of Ontario, Mazzotta 1985
 Ulm … die Moral der Gegenstände, Ernst und Sohn 1987
 Geschichte der Produktivkräfte, zgraf 1987
 Der Gestalter als Autor, Werk+Zeit, Nr. 3/4 1983
 Wir fliegen alle durchs Ozonloch, Design Report, Nr. 9/1989
 Designed in Germany, Hrsg. M. Erlhoff, Prestel 1990
 Fachhochschule für Gestaltung Schwäbisch Gmünd, Novum, Nr. 9/1991
 Diskussion zwischen zwei großen deutschen Typographen Klar – Kroeplien, Druckspiegel, Nr. 6/1991
 Objekt+Objektiv=Objektivität? Fotografie an der HfG, HfG Archiv Ulm, 1991
 International Exhibition of Graphic Design + Communication, Zagreb, zgraf, Nr. 6/1991
 Globoscope, Form + Zweck, Nr.4+5/1992
 Globale Information – ein Projekt, Zukunft des Raums, campus 1994, 
 Integriertes Verkehrskonzept, Olympia Express 2000, IDZ Berlin 1994
 Sprechende Bauten, design report 9/1995 
 Globale Information – ein Projekt, Positionen zur Gestaltung, Bremen 1995
 Freunde und Begegnungen, Süddeutsche Verlagsgesellschaft 1997
 Das Ganze ist mehr als die Summe seiner Teile, Kompendium Corporate Identity und Corporate Design, av edition, 1997
 Gestaltung im Projekt der Moderne, av edition, 1997
 Design ist verkommen, design is a journey, Springer Verlag 1997
 Kouakourou – Tokio, Designtheorie, anabas 2001
 Institut für Transmediale Gestaltung, Hochschule der Künste Berlin, 2001
 tomás, seniorservice books, Milano 2002
 Konkrete Utopie HfG, design report 10/2003
 Berlin Nachtausgabe, Berlin Night Edition, Hrsg. Michael Klar, nicolai 2007
 PingPongProjekt, Ein Projekt der Grafikdesign-Ausbildung… Hrsg. Severin Wucher, Gao Yi, Jiangxi Fine Arts Publishing House, 2008
 IUAV DESIGN WORKSHOP 09, IN MOVIMENTO, 2009
 Kommando Otl Aicher, Rede zum UdK Preis 2012, Universität der Künste 2014
 Kritik an der Rolle des Design in der Verschwendungsgesellschaft, Design, Texte zur Geschichte und Theorie, Reclam, Universal-Bibliothek, Stuttgart 2018

References

External links 
 Website of Michael Klar's office
 Michael Klar's project group at the Universität der Künste, Berlin
 HfG Ulm Archiv Ausstellungen
 Michael Klar in the catalogue of the German National Library

German contemporary artists
Artists from Berlin
1943 births
Living people